Silex is a 4th-class city in Lincoln County, Missouri, United States. The population was 280 at the 2010 census.

History
Silex had its start in the 1880s when the railroad known as the Northern Hannibal Railway was extended to the town for the purpose of transportation. A post office called Silex has been in operation since 1882. The community was named after the main cash crop production of silicon sand. The Silex original township was located approximately a quarter mile north of the current old town portion now. The original town was located next to the Hannibal Railroad, and many of the town's inhabitants worked in the silicon mine. As many settlers and farmers moved to the area for work and settling, the town started to grow. The town relocated to what is now called the old town portion of Silex due to space issues. The town had shut down the production of silicon sand due to imperfections in the sand, and most of the settlers stayed and began to farm. The town became a center point for shopping, trade, social events and festivals that brought many from afar. Some of the town's rich history of farming and mining is standing today. One building that is still standing on MO Hwy E also known as Main Street has the engraved carving of 1908 when the building had been built. Amother is the Duncan Mansion located on top on the bluff looking over the city. There are few buildings standing in the old town portion of Silex due to flooding. The town has sustained several floods that devastated the townspeople due to flash flooding. The town is surrounded by local waterways, creeks, and a river.

The town has recently annexed a portion of Missouri Highway E towards 61 to Mo RA and plans to grow the town, while keeping a small-town feel. The city's administrator and Chief of Police William Barnes II gave the town its first city logo and slogan in early 2016. The City of Silex's slogan is "A rural City Moving Forward".

2008 floods

In 2008, Silex flooded and displaced most of the residents. This had a major impact on the small town, forcing it to come up with other options. With the county as a whole facing financial difficulties in revenues and the town also losing business from the flood, the trustees decided to move the residents out of the flood way and plain. After the town applied for a relocation grant from USDA, it was granted partial funding for the move in sections. First and foremost: moving the residents to a safe location. Some accomplished this by agreeing to build a new home at a special rate and were given grant funds to do so, and some residents took a portion of the grant funding and simply picked their house up and moved it up on the hill in the city's new Stephens Bluff addition. With the move of a whole town, there were many complications in the process and these are ongoing. One is removing the old households, many of which had contaminated pipes because of the age of the homes, and re-engineering city utility services. The move of the town to its new location has taken the people out of harm's way. But with the difficult time of the economy, the town still has an open project to this date on the original plans and struggles to meet Department of Natural Resource requirements because of the relocation project. The town had applied for infrastructure grants and received one in late 2008 for a sewer project. That came at a price of issuing bonds to pay for the project which was another out of pocket expense for residents. This is still an ongoing project to this date with the finalization of the project to be completed in December 2015.

Before the project was finalized, the town was hit with another flood in the spring of 2015. With a small work force, city employees scrambled and only one boil order was issued, and city services continued. Many residents were stunned that they had lost water in the new town portion, but during the storm that had dropped seven inches of rain on the city and points north, the new water tower was struck by lightning and disabled the pump. With all of the town's sewer lift stations underwater and the town's sewer treatment plant also submerged, this was a major test for the city. The workers and even the town Chief of Police jumped into action. Several people who lived just outside of town had to be rescued by boat from the second story windows of their home. "This was the fastest I have ever seen it come up and I've lived here all my life", said local resident Johnny Thompson. The 2015 flood has been the highest flood event on record for the town. Reminiscence of this is painted on the rear wall of Baragiola Hardware and Lumber.

Education
Silex R-1 School District, established in 1912, serves students in Silex and surrounding communities. Silex has 1 high school, Silex High School.

Geography
Silex is located at  (39.122968, -91.057371).

Duncan Mansion is located in Silex.

Demographics

2010 census
As of the census of 2010, there were 187 people, 57 households, and 37 families residing in the village. The racial makeup of the village was 97.9% White and 2.1% African American.

There were 57 households, of which 29.8% had children under the age of 18 living with them, 36.8% were married couples living together, 21.1% had a female householder with no husband present, 7.0% had a male householder with no wife present, and 35.1% were non-families. 29.8% of all households were made up of individuals, and 8.8% had someone living alone who was 65 years of age or older. The average household size was 2.53 and the average family size was 3.16.

The median age in the city was 38.8 years. 22.5% of residents were under the age of 18; 10.1% were between the ages of 18 and 24; 21.4% were from 25 to 44; 33.7% were from 45 to 64; and 12.3% were 65 years of age or older. The gender makeup of the village was 51.9% male and 48.1% female.

2000 census
As of the census of 2000, there were 206 people, 80 households, and 59 families residing in the village. The racial makeup of the village was 99.03% White, and 0.97% from two or more races.

There were 80 households, out of which 33.8% had children under the age of 18 living with them, 53.8% were married couples living together, 16.3% had a female householder with no husband present, and 26.3% were non-families. 21.3% of all households were made up of individuals, and 6.3% had someone living alone who was 65 years of age or older. The average household size was 2.58 and the average family size was 2.97.

In the city the population was spread out, with 26.2% under the age of 18, 8.7% from 18 to 24, 33.0% from 25 to 44, 18.4% from 45 to 64, and 13.6% who were 65 years of age or older. The median age was 37 years. For every 100 females there were 106.0 males. For every 100 females age 18 and over, there were 97.4 males.

The median income for a household in the city was $24,531, and the median income for a family was $33,125. Males had a median income of $30,313 versus $19,167 for females. The per capita income for the city was $12,529. About 11.3% of families and 12.5% of the population were below the poverty line, including 10.4% of those under the age of eighteen and none of those sixty-five or over.

References

External links
 Historic maps of Silex in the Sanborn Maps of Missouri Collection at the University of Missouri

Cities in Missouri
Cities in Lincoln County, Missouri